Soulby is a village and civil parish in the Eden district of Cumbria, England. The parish had a population of 186 in 2001, increasing slightly to 187 at the 2011 Census. The village has a village green.

Famous people
Robert Howard Hutton, bonesetter, was born here in 1840.

See also
Listed buildings in Soulby

References

External links
 Cumbria County History Trust: Soulby (nb: provisional research only – see Talk page)

Villages in Cumbria
Civil parishes in Cumbria
Eden District